Roman Andreyevich Savosin (born 4 December 1999) is a Russian figure skater. He is the 2019 Junior World silver medalist, the 2016 CS Tallinn Trophy champion, 2016 CS Ondrej Nepela Memorial bronze medalist, and 2016 JGP France champion.

Career 
Savosin began learning to skate in 2003.

2015–2016 season 
After winning the bronze medal at the 2016 Russian Junior Championships, he was selected to compete at the 2016 World Junior Championships in Debrecen. He qualified for the free skate in Hungary by placing thirteenth in the short program and went on to finish fourteenth overall.

2016–2017 season 
Savosin received his first Junior Grand Prix (JGP) assignment in the 2016–17 season. Ranked second in both segments, he won the gold medal in Saint-Gervais-les-Bains, France, by a margin of 7.74 points over his teammate Ilia Skirda. After winning bronze at his second JGP event, in Ostrava, Czech Republic, he qualified to the JGP Final.

Savosin's senior international debut came in late September and early October 2016 at a Challenger Series (CS) event, the Ondrej Nepela Memorial. He placed fifth in the short and second in the free skate to win the bronze medal with a personal best score of 222.37 points, behind Sergei Voronov and Kevin Reynolds. In November, he outscored Anton Shulepov for gold at the 2016 CS Tallinn Trophy after placing second in the short and first in the free skate. Competing at the 2016–17 JGP Final, held in December in Marseille, he placed third in the short, fourth in the free, and fourth overall.

2017–2018 season 

Savosin started his season by competing in the 2017 JGP series. He first won the silver medal in Brisbane, Australia, and then he placed fourth in Riga, Latvia. In November he placed fourth at the 2017 CS Warsaw Cup.

In December 2017 Savosin placed tenth at the 2018 Russian Championships. In January 2018 he won the silver medal at the 2018 Russian Junior Championships after placing sixth in the short program and second in the free skate. 

In March 2018 Savosin competed at the 2018 Junior Worlds where he placed fifth after placing twelfth in the short program and fifth in the free skate.

2018–2019 season 
Savosin started his season by competing in the 2018 JGP series. At his first JGP event of the season he placed fifth in Bratislava, Slovakia. At his second JGP event he won the bronze medal in Linz, Austria. In late November Savosin finished fifth at the 2018 CS Tallinn Trophy. At the 2019 Russian Championships, he placed 12th. A month later, Savosin to earn the bronze medal at junior nationals and qualify for 2019 World Junior Championships.

In the 2019 World Junior Championships, he finished sixth in the short and first in the free, with a total of 229.28 points, Savosin won silver medal.

2019–2020 season 
Competing in his first senior Grand Prix, Savoisin finished twelfth at the 2019 Skate America.

2020–2021 season 
Savosin debuted at the senior Russian test skates after recovering from injury. Competing on the domestic Cup of Russia series, he won the silver medal at the first stage in Syzran and came sixth at the fourth stage in Kazan.

With the COVID-19 pandemic continuing to affect international travel, the ISU opted to run the Grand Prix based primarily on geographic location. Savosin was assigned to the 2020 Rostelecom Cup, where he placed eighth in both segments and overall.

Savosin withdrew from the 2021 Russian Championships after contracting COVID-19.

2021–2022 season 
Savosin finished in fifteenth place at the 2022 Russian Championships.

Programs

Competitive highlights 
GP: Grand Prix; CS: Challenger Series; JGP: Junior Grand Prix

Detailed results 
Small medals for short and free programs awarded only at ISU Championships.

References

External links 
 
 

1999 births
Russian male single skaters
World Junior Figure Skating Championships medalists
Living people
Figure skaters from Moscow